Tabernaemontana bouquetii is a species of plant in the family Apocynaceae. It is found in Congo, and Gabon.

References

bouqetii